Naujene Parish is an administrative unit of Augšdaugava Municipality in the Latgale region of Latvia.

Towns, villages and settlements of Naujene Parish 
 Lociki
 Slutiški

See also 
 Dinaburga Castle

 
Parishes of Latvia
Latgale